Manoba is a genus of moths in the family Nolidae. The genus was first described by Francis Walker in 1863.

Description
Palpi long and porrect (extending forward), where the first two joints thickly scaled. Antennae heavily bipectinated (comb like on both sides) in male. Mid tibia with single pair of spurs, and hind tibia with two pairs. Forewings with vein 3 from before angle of cell, veins 4 and 5 from angle, vein 6 from upper angle, veins 7 and 8 stalked and veins 9 and 10 absent. Hindwings with vein 3 from before angle of cell, vein 5 absent, veins 6 and 7 stalked, and vein 8 from middle of cell.

Species
 Manoba adriennae László, G. Ronkay & Witt, 2010
 Manoba allani Holloway, 2003
 Manoba albina Rothschild, 1912
 Manoba albiplagiata Rothschild, 1912
 Manoba argentalis (Moore, 1867)
 Manoba argentaloides Holloway, 2003
 Manoba banghaasi (West, 1929)
 Manoba briggsi Holloway, 2003
 Manoba bulli Holloway, 2003
 Manoba carrei Holloway, 2003
 Manoba chamberlaini Holloway, 2003
 Manoba chirgwini Holloway, 2003
 Manoba coadei Holloway, 2003
 Manoba coxi Holloway, 2003
 Manoba costimaculata Kiriakoff, 1958
 Manoba cowleyi Holloway, 2003
 Manoba divisa Rothschild, 1913
 Manoba fasciatus (Hampson, 1894)
 Manoba gilletti Holloway, 2003
 Manoba goodfieldi Holloway, 2003
 Manoba greenwoodi Holloway, 2003
 Manoba grisealis (Swinhoe, 1895)
 Manoba grisescens Rothschild, 1912
 Manoba gyulaipeteri László, G. Ronkay & Witt, 2010
 Manoba harthani (Holloway, 1976)
 Manoba implens Walker, 1863
 Manoba izuensis (Inoue, 1961)
 Manoba javanica (van Eecke, 1920)
 Manoba jinghongensis T.Y. Shao, C.D. Li & H.L. Han, 2009
 Manoba lactogrisea Rothschild, 1912
 Manoba lativittata (Moore, 1888)
 Manoba lilliptiana (Inoue, 1998)
 Manoba major (Hampson, 1891)
 Manoba marshalli Holloway, 2003
 Manoba melancholica (Wileman & West, 1928)
 Manoba melanomedia (Inoue, 1991)
 Manoba melanota (Hampson, 1900)
 Manoba microphasma (Butler, 1885)
 Manoba munda de Joannis, 1928
 Manoba paucilinea de Joannis, 1928
 Manoba phaeochroa (Hampson, 1900)
 Manoba poecila (Wileman & West, 1928)
 Manoba postpuncta Rothschild, 1913
 Manoba potterorum Holloway, 2003
 Manoba punctilineata (Hampson, 1896)
 Manoba rennicki Holloway, 2003
 Manoba ronkaylaszloi László, G. Ronkay & Witt, 2010
 Manoba shrimptoni Holloway, 2003
 Manoba subfuscataria (Inoue, 1998)
 Manoba subtribei H.L. Han & C.D. Li, 2008
 Manoba suffusata (Wileman & West, 1929)
 Manoba sumatrana (Roepke, 1948)
 Manoba terminalis Rothschild, 1912
 Manoba tesselata (Hampson, 1896)
 Manoba tribei Holloway, 2003
 Manoba triparallellinea (van Eecke, 1920)
 Manoba tristicta (Hampson, 1900)
 Manoba umbrimedia De Joannis, 1928

Selected former species
 Manoba bipunctulata van Eecke, 1927
 Manoba brunellus (Hampson, 1893)
 Manoba erythromedia (Inoue, 1998)
 Manoba fractilinea Snellen, 1880
 Manoba obliquilinea Hampson, 1900
 Manoba obscura Inoue, 1976
 Manoba rectilinea Snellen, 1879
 Manoba rufofasciata Rothschild, 1913
 Manoba taeniatus Rothschild, 1916
 Manoba umbrata van Eecke, 1927
 Manoba yoshimotoi Inoue, 2000

Taxonomy
Some sources list Manoba as a synonym of Nola Leach, 1815.

References

Han, Hui-Lin & Li, Cheng-De (2008). "Description of a new Nolinae species, Manoba subtribei sp. nov. (Lepidoptera: Noctuidae) from South China". Tinea. 20 (3): 144–145.
László, G. M.; Ronkay, G. & Witt, T. J. (2010). "Contribution to the Nolinae (Lepidoptera, Noctuidae) fauna of North Thailand". Esperiana Buchreihe zur Entomologie. 15: 7–126.
Shao, T.-Y.; Li, C.-D. & Han, H.-L. (2009). "Description of a new species of the genus Manoba from Prov. Yunnan, China (Lepidoptera, Noctuidae, Nolinae)". Tinea. 20 (5): 307–308.

Nolinae